Moses Odjer (born 17 August 1996) is a Ghanaian footballer who plays as a central midfielder for  club Foggia.

Club career
Odjer started playing for local Tema Youth, and made his senior debuts for the club in 2012, aged only 16. On 26 August 2014 he signed a five-year deal with Italian side Calcio Catania, freshly relegated to Serie B.

Odjer played his first match as a professional on 29 November 2014, replacing injured Alexis Rolín in a 0–1 away loss against Ternana Calcio.

In summer 2015 Odjer left for Salernitana on loan, with an option to sign him outright. On 22 June 2016 Salernitana excised the option.

On 23 January 2020, he moved to Serie B club Trapani.

On 19 September 2020, he joined Serie C powerhouse Palermo on a free transfer.

He left Palermo in June 2022 as his contract was not extended following the Rosanero's promotion to Serie B in the 2021–22 Serie C playoff tournament. He successively signed a two-year contract for Foggia, another Serie C club.

Career statistics

Club

References

1996 births
People from Tema
Living people
Ghanaian footballers
Ghana under-20 international footballers
Association football midfielders
Serie B players
Catania S.S.D. players
Palermo F.C. players
U.S. Salernitana 1919 players
Trapani Calcio players
Calcio Foggia 1920 players
Ghanaian expatriate footballers
Expatriate footballers in Italy
Ghanaian expatriate sportspeople in Italy